Pontia is a genus of pierid butterflies. They are found in the Holarctic, but are rare in Europe and central to eastern North America, and a few species range into the Afrotropics. Several East Asian species once placed here are now more often split off in Sinopieris. Like the closely related genus Pieris, they are commonly called whites.

Species
Listed alphabetically:
 Pontia beckerii (Edwards, 1871) – Becker's white, Great Basin white, or sagebrush white 
 Pontia callidice (Hübner, 1799-1800) – peak white
 Pontia chloridice (Hübner, 1808-1813) – small Bath white
 Pontia daplidice (Linnaeus, 1758) – Bath white
 Pontia distorta (Butler, 1886) – small meadow white
 Pontia edusa (Fabricius, 1777) - eastern Bath white
 Pontia glauconome (Klug, 1829) – desert (Bath) white
 Pontia helice (Linnaeus, 1764) – meadow white
 Pontia occidentalis (Reakirt, 1866) – western white 
 Pontia protodice (Boisduval & Le Conte, 1830) – checkered white
 Pontia sisymbrii (Boisduval, 1852) – spring white, California white, or Colorado white

Some other species are occasionally placed here, but alternatively in other genera. Pontia extensa may belong in Pieris, while a number of other species from the China region are often split off in Sinopieris:
 Pontia davidis (Shaanxi, Sichuan, Tibet, Yunnan)
 Pontia dubernardi  (Gansu, Nanshan, Shaanxi, Sichuan, Tibet, Yunnan)
 Pontia kozlovi (Xinjiang)
 Pontia sherpae (Nepal)
 Pontia stoetzneri (Sichuan, Yunnan)
 Pontia venata (Ta-chien-lu, at altitude 3000 m)

References

External links
Images representing Pontia at Consortium for the Barcode of Life
Eurobutterflies

Further reading
 Glassberg, Jeffrey Butterflies through Binoculars, The West (2001)
 Guppy, Crispin S. and Shepard, Jon H. Butterflies of British Columbia (2001)
 James, David G. and Nunnallee, David Life Histories of Cascadia Butterflies (2011)
 Pelham, Jonathan Catalogue of the Butterflies of the United States and Canada (2008)
 Pyle, Robert Michael The Butterflies of Cascadia (2002)

External links
 Butterflies and Moths of North America
 Butterflies of America

 
Pierini
Pieridae genera
Taxa named by Johan Christian Fabricius